The 2013 Middle East cold snap, also referred to as Alexa, refers to the winter storm that hit the Middle East region in December 2013, affecting Syria, Palestine, Jordan, Israel, Lebanon, Turkey, and Egypt. The storm severely affected millions of poor and displaced people across the region, especially afflicting refugees from the Syrian civil war.

Meteorological history
Beginning December 11, a large anticyclone moved northward in the jet stream over Europe; its east edge drew a strong current of cold air south from the Arctic. This polar outbreak overspread Turkey and the Eastern Mediterranean region, pushing below moist air associated with a passing front, causing heavy snow and sleet over higher ground in Syria, Lebanon, Jordan, and Israel. At lower elevations, heavy rain from the system caused flooding in some areas.

(The west edge of the same anticyclone drew in a warm southwest wind from around the Azores to Britain.)

Events by country

Cyprus
By December 14, the storm had covered the island's Troodos mountain range with snow. Four hundred customers lost electricity, and several villages, including Armenohori, Farmakas, Kampi, and Sinaoros, completely lost it for extended periods of time.

Egypt
Egypt's capital Cairo witnessed extremely rare snowfall (mostly graupel) on Friday, December 13, that the local media claimed to be the first in 112 years. Snow also fell heavily on mountains in the Sinai Peninsula.

Israel

Warmer parts of Israel received heavy rains, causing floods. The railway into Jerusalem operated on the Sabbath for people stranded by blocked roads.

Roads were closed in Israel by deep snow and flooding. Storm clouds prompted Ben Gurion International Airport to shut down, forcing US Secretary of State John Kerry to cut short his meeting with Palestinian President Mahmoud Abbas in Ramallah and return to the West Bank before roads and airports became unusable. Jerusalem was cut off for 48 hours by deep snow and flooding and cars were abandoned after they got stuck in snow.

Palestine, West Bank
On December 13, 2013, 40–70 cm (16–28 in) of snow fell in Jerusalem. Warmer parts of Palestine received heavy rains, causing floods. The railway into Jerusalem was stranded by blocked roads.
Ramallah, Bethlehem, Jerusalem, and Hebron and many other towns and cities were coated in snow and some lower-lying areas suffered flooding from heavy rain.

The scene in Manger Square, the square adjacent to the Church of the Nativity was that of a white Christmas with the square fully decorated and covered with a deep coat of snow.

Palestine, Gaza Strip
The Gaza Strip was lashed by torrential rain for a third day, and its Hamas rulers said that residents had been evacuated from 60 flooded homes since storms hit the coastal territory on December 11.

Jordan
In Jordan, Ghazi Sarhan, spokesman for Jordan's Administration of Syrian Refugee Camps, announced on December 13, that "During the past 48 hours 10,000 blankets and 1,500 heaters have been distributed to refugees." Deep snow fell in Amman, where King Abdullah II of Jordan helped to push a car that had got stuck in snow.

Lebanon

While snow is a common yearly occurrence in Lebanon, many Syrian refugees were severely affected by the unusually cold conditions.
It was reported that the Lebanese Army was called in to help distribute emergency aid to refugees, and the UN handed out fuel, blankets, heaters and food rations amid a third day of severe winter weather in the region.

According to Abou Faour's announcement, published in Al Nahar newspaper on December 12, "There are 1,600 refugee [makeshift camps] in addition to 431 random camps, which makes it difficult to reach these places. That is why the cabinet had to ask for the help of the army to make as much aid reach those refugees as possible".

Syria

The United Nations High Commission for Refugees (UNHCR) issued plans to airlift  of food for 50,000 to 60,000 people into the northeastern province of Hasakah from Iraq. The UN airlift of urgently needed food for tens of thousands of people in northeastern Syria, originally planned for December 12, was delayed by snow.

According to Matthew Hollingworth, Syria Country Director for the United Nations' World Food Programme, most internally displaced Syrians fled their homes with few belongings so they do not even have enough warm clothes or blankets to fend off the freezing weather. They desperately need fuel for heating and to cook the food they receive as humanitarian assistance." Reportedly, a child and a baby died from the cold on December 12, and an activist in a besieged rebel-held town of Harra said residents were struggling to stay warm with the electricity cut off and no food or fuel allowed in.

External links
 Snow in the Egyptian town of Madinaty, 40 km east of Cairo, on December 13, 2013.
 'Snow Blankets Eastern Mediterranean: , Palestine, Syria, Cyprus and Lebanon'
 King Abdullah II of Jordan in Amman helping to push a car which got stuck in deep snow
 
 Google: snow scenes in Egypt and Sinai
 Snow in Cairo
 Snow in Egypt and Sinai

References

Middle East cold snap
Middle East cold snap
Middle East cold snap
Middle East cold snap
Middle East cold snap
Middle East cold snap
Middle East cold snap
Middle East cold snap
Middle East cold snap
Middle East cold snap
Middle East cold snap
Middle East cold snap
Middle East cold snap
Middle East cold snap
2013 disasters in Asia